The Man Without Sleep (German: Der Mann ohne Schlaf) is a 1926 German silent film directed by Carl Boese and starring Harry Liedtke, Maly Delschaft, and Fritz Kampers. It premiered in Berlin on 12 February 1926. The film's art direction was by Julius von Borsody.

Cast
 Harry Liedtke   
 Maly Delschaft   
 Fritz Kampers   
 Helga Molander   
 Emil Heyse   
 Hugo Fischer-Köppe   
 Hanni Weisse

References

Bibliography
 Grange, William. Cultural Chronicle of the Weimar Republic. Scarecrow Press, 2008.

External links

1926 films
Films of the Weimar Republic
German silent feature films
Films directed by Carl Boese
German black-and-white films
Terra Film films